Valier Patch is an unincorporated community in Franklin County, Illinois, United States.

References

Unincorporated communities in Franklin County, Illinois
Unincorporated communities in Illinois